Lovingly Yours, Helen is a Philippine television drama anthology broadcast by GMA Network and Banahaw Broadcasting Corporation. The show is the second longest running drama anthology in Philippine television history. Originally hosted by Helen Vela, it premiered on September 7, 1980. The show transferred to BBC in September 1984. It returned to GMA Network in April 1986. The show concluded on September 1, 1996. It was replaced by Anna Karenina in its timeslot.

The anthology evolved into a television drama anthology from a daily counseling program on radio with the same title, originally aired on GMA's AM station DZBB. It was presented by television/radio personality Helen Vela. Each episode is based on the letter sender's life stories sent by viewers. This format also served as a template of other drama anthologies aired on Philippine television.

The show's radio version, which is a live counselling program, continued to air on weekdays. The radio show moved to BBC's FM station DWOK-FM in 1984, and returned to DZBB in 1986.

As Lovingly Yours, Helen
In 1980, the program transformed from a radio program to a television drama anthology. Among some of the stars appeared on this program's episodes are: Nora Aunor, Christopher de Leon, Vilma Santos, Sheryl Cruz, Manilyn Reynes, Aga Muhlach, Maricel Soriano, Romnick Sarmenta, Sharon Cuneta, Tonton Gutierrez, Mary Walter, Bong Revilla, Jr. and Kris Aquino.  A rare episode in the drama series was also shown sometime in 1990 when Helen Vela starred alongside close friends Coney Reyes, Vilma Santos and Tina Revilla-Valencia.

Lovingly Yours: The Movie
In 1984, due to immense popularity of the program, Lovingly Yours, Helen was adapted into a four-part anthology film directed by Argel Joseph.

As Lovingly Yours
Following Vela's death in 1992, her daughter Princess Punzalan (who was the wife of TV personality Willie Revillame at the time) took over her late mother's hosting responsibilities.

Accolades

References

External links
 

1980 Philippine television series debuts
1996 Philippine television series endings
Filipino-language television shows
GMA Network original programming
Philippine anthology television series